= With Hindenburg for a National Prussia (United Patriotic Leagues and Associations) =

With Hindenburg for a national Prussia (United Patriotic Leagues and Associations) (German: Mit Hindenburg für ein nationales Preußen (Vereinigte Vaterländische Verbände und Vereine)) was a candidature for the 1933 election to the Prussian Landtag. The candidature belonged to the same electoral bloc as the NSDAP. The candidature got 206,919 votes (0.87% of the Prussian vote) but no seats in the Landtag.
